Baigou railway station is a station on the Tianjin–Baoding intercity railway in Xiong County, Xiong'an New Area, Baoding, Hebei.

Station layout

History 
The station was opened on 28 December 2015, together with the Tianjin–Baoding intercity railway.

References 

Railway stations in Hebei
Stations on the Tianjin–Baoding Intercity Railway
Railway stations in China opened in 2015